Local elections were held on May 13, 2013 in the province of Bohol as part of the 2013 Philippine General election.  Registered voters elected local positions, which were 386 city and municipal councilors, 48 city and town mayors and vice-mayors, 10 provincial board or Sangguniang Panlalawigan members, one governor and vice-governor, and one representative for each of the three districts of Bohol. 
 
The registration ended in October 2012, with registered 775,785 voters, a 45,871 or 6.28% increase from the 729,914 registered voters in 2010. With the use of PCOS machines, the former 4,718 precincts were compressed into 2,473 clustered precincts to accommodate voters in the entire province.

At the end of the filing of certificates of candidacy issued by Comelec on October 5, 2012, a total of 1,132 hopefuls had filed certificates of candidacy for 497 elective positions. Based on the official list of provincial Commission on Elections, 881 aspirants ran for councilors, 108 for mayors, 107 for vice mayors, 23 for provincial board members, 4 for governor, 3 for vice governor, and six for congress in three districts.

Provincial Election Results
The governor and vice governor with the highest number of votes won the seat.  However, they were voted separately, so they could be from different parties when elected.

Governor
Parties below were as stated in certificates of candidacies. The total number of voters was 559,983 (72.18% of total registered voters).

Vice-Governor
Parties were stated in certificate of candidacies. The total number of voters was 559,983 (72.18% of total registered voters).

Sangguniang Panlalawigan
Both the 1st and 2nd Districts of Bohol elected three Sangguniang Panlalawigan or provincial board members. The 3rd District, with highest population, elected four board members. The candidates with the highest number of votes won the seats allocated for each district, with the number of winning candidates per district equal to the number of seats that district sent to the provincial legislature.

1st District
Parties were stated in certificate of candidacies. The total number of voters was 192,410.

|bgcolor=black colspan=5|

2nd District
Parties were stated in certificate of candidacies. The total number of voters was 196,879.

|bgcolor=black colspan=5|

3rd District
Parties were as stated in certificate of candidacies. The total number of voters was 170,694.

|bgcolor=black colspan=5|

Congressional election results
Each of Bohol's three legislative districts elected representative to the House of Representatives. The candidate with the highest number of votes won the seat.

1st District, Congressman
City: Tagbilaran City
Municipality: Alburquerque, Antequera, Baclayon, Balilihan, Calape, Catigbian, Corella, Cortes, Dauis, Loon, Maribojoc, Panglao, Sikatuna, Tubigon
Population (2010): 415,420

Rene Relampagos was the incumbent. The mayor of Tagbilaran City, Dan Neri Lim, challenged him for the congressional seat. Parties were as stated in certificate of candidacies. The total number of voters was 192,410.

2nd District, Congressman
City: none
Municipality: Bien Unido, Buenavista, Clarin, Dagohoy, Danao, Getafe, Inabanga, Pres. Carlos P. Garcia, Sagbayan, San Isidro, San Miguel, Talibon, Trinidad, Ubay
Population (2010): 415,878

Incumbent Erico B. Aumentado died while in office on December 25, 2012. The Nationalist People's Coalition replaced him with a substitute against his perennial rival, former three-term congressman and by then, incumbent Trinidad mayor Roberto Cajes. Forty days after his father's death, Aumentado's youngest son and acting congressman Erico Aristotle filed his certificate of candidacy. Parties below were as stated in certificate of candidacies. The total number of voters was 196,879.

3rd District, Congressman
City: none
Municipality: Alicia, Anda, Batuan, Bilar, Candijay, Carmen, Dimiao, Duero, Garcia Hernandez, Guindulman, Jagna, Lila, Loay, Loboc, Mabini, Pilar, Sevilla, Sierra Bullones, Valencia
Population (2010): 423,830

Arthur Yap of Loboc was the incumbent.  Last term Loboc Mayor Leon Calipusan filed his CONA under the administration ticket. However, on January 9, 2013, Calipusan filed an affidavit of withdrawal, indicating family and health reasons. It made Arthur Yap unopposed for two consecutive elections. Parties were stated in certificate of candidacies. The total number of voters was 170,694.

City and Municipal Elections Results
All municipalities of Bohol and Tagbilaran City elected mayors, vice-mayors, and councilors. The mayor and vice mayor with the highest number of votes won the seat.  They were voted separately, and therefore could be from different parties when elected. Below is the list of mayoralty and vice-mayoralty candidates of each city and municipalities per district.

First District

Tagbilaran City
Parties were stated on certificates of candidacy. The total number voters was 40,548, equivalent to 78.79% of 51,462 registered voters.

Alburquerque
Parties were stated on certificates of candidacy.

Antequera
Municipal Councilor Simeon Leo Jadulco ran unopposed for vice mayor under the Liberal Party.

Baclayon

Balilihan

Calape
Brothers Sulpicio Yu and Nelson Yu sought re-election as mayor and vice mayor, respectively, under the Liberal Party.

Catigbian

Corella
Total number of voters was 4,327, out of 4,898 registered voters, or 88.34%

Cortes

Dauis

Loon

Maribojoc

Election Turnouts: (88.33%) 10,771 of 12,194 Registered Voters

Panglao

Sikatuna
Incumbent Mayor Jose Ellorimo Jr. ran unopposed under the Liberal Party (LP) ticket.

Tubigon

Second District

Bien Unido

Buenavista

Clarin
Election Turnouts: (88.01%) 11,583 of 13,160 Registered Voters

Dagohoy

Danao

Getafe

Election Turnouts: (86.94%) 16,455 of 18,926 Registered Voters

Inabanga

Pres. Carlos P. Garcia

Election Turnouts: (81.07%) 11,668 of 14,392 registered voters

Sagbayan

San Isidro
Election Turnouts: (88.82%) 5,457 of 6,144 Registered Voters

San Miguel

Talibon

Trinidad

Ubay

Third District

Alicia
Incumbent Mayor Marilou Ayuban and Vice Mayor Basilio Balahay ran unopposed under the Liberal Party (LP) ticket.

Anda

Batuan
Re-electionist and incumbent Vice Mayor Antonino Jumawid ran unopposed under the Liberal Party (LP) ticket.

Bilar

Candijay

Carmen

Dimiao

Duero

Garcia Hernandez

Guindulman

Jagna

Lila
Incumbent Mayor Regina Salazar ran unopposed under the Liberal Party (LP) ticket.

Loay

Loboc

Election Turnouts: ( 88.18%) 9,700 of 11,000 Registered Voters

Mabini

Pilar

Sevilla

Sierra Bullones

Valencia

References

External links
COMELEC - Official website of the Philippine Commission on Elections (COMELEC)
NAMFREL - Official website of National Movement for Free Elections (NAMFREL)
PPCRV - Official website of the Parish Pastoral Council for Responsible Voting (PPCRV)

2013 Philippine local elections